Wilhelm Bahlburg (27 October 1888 – 17 February 1958) was a German politician of the German Party (DP) and former member of the German Bundestag.

Life 
From 1949 to 1953 he was a member of the German Bundestag for the constituency of Harburg - Soltau. He died in Buchholz in der Nordheide.

Literature

References

1888 births
1958 deaths
Members of the Bundestag for Lower Saxony
Members of the Bundestag 1949–1953
German Party (1947) politicians
Members of the Bundestag for the German Party (1947)
Members of the Landtag of Lower Saxony